The 2000 South Tyneside Council Metropolitan Borough election took place on 4 May 2000 to elect members of South Tyneside Metropolitan Borough Council in Tyne and Wear, England. One third of the council was up for election and the Labour Party kept overall control of the council.

After the election, the composition of the council was:
Labour 50
Liberal Democrat 6
Others 4

Election result
Labour maintained their control of the council with only one independent gain being made in the election.

References

2000
2000 English local elections
20th century in Tyne and Wear